Echinocereus fasciculatus, commonly known as pinkflower hedgehog cactus, is a clumping cactus (Cactaceae) with brilliant magenta flowers and long spines found in the Sonoran Desert.

References

fasciculatus
Cacti of the United States
Flora of the Sonoran Deserts